The 1997 CSKA season was the club's sixth season in the Russian Top League, the highest tier of association football in Russia.

Squad

Transfers

In:

Out:

Competitions

Top League

Results by round

Results

Table

Russian Cup

1996-97

1997-98

The Quarterfinal took place during the 1998 season.

Squad Statistics

Appearances and goals

|-
|colspan="14"|Players out on loan:

|-
|colspan="14"|Players who left CSKA Moscow during the season:

|}

Goal Scorers

Disciplinary Record

References

PFC CSKA Moscow seasons
CSKA Moscow